Snehasish Chakraborty (born 16 February 1989) is an Indian football player. He most notably played for Prayag United in the I-League as a midfielder.

Career

Early career
While living in Icchapur, he used to attend a coaching camp. In Shyamnagar, he used to practice under Jahar Biswas who used to come all the way from Naihati. When he was in Class 7, he played in Sodepur Nursery League along with players like Lalkamal Bhowmick who is his childhood buddy.

In the year 2004-05, he moved to Eveready where he played under the coaching of Aloke Mukherjee. After staying 1 year in Eveready, he played 2 years for East Bengal F.C. before changing over to Chirag United.

Mohun Bagan
Chakraborty started his football career with Mohun Bagan in 2009-10. In his first season, he played eight games and scored one goal. He spent four seasons with them.

Prayag United
For the 2013-14 season he signed for Prayag United S.C. He made his debut in the I-League on 6 October 2013 against Bengaluru FC at the Bangalore Football Stadium in which he came on as a substitute for Shouvik Chakraborty in 61st minute as Prayag United lost the match 1-0.

International
Chakraborty was first selected for the India U23 team in June 2011 for the 2012 Olympics qualifiers against Qatar U-23 but he did not feature in each of the two matches for India.

References

External links
 http://goal.com/en-india/people/india/34121/snehasish-chakrabarty
 https://archive.today/20110714111454/http://mohunbaganac.com/SEPT08/playerdetails.php?playerId=102

Indian footballers
1989 births
Living people
People from North 24 Parganas district
Footballers from West Bengal
East Bengal Club players
United SC players
Mohun Bagan AC players
Calcutta Football League players
I-League players
Association football midfielders